Frederick Christian Schang, Jr. (December 15, 1893 – August 26, 1990) was a talent agent and later president of Columbia Artists Management.

Biography
He was born on December 15, 1893 and attended the Columbia School of Journalism. After graduation he was a reporter for the New-York Tribune.  He then worked for the Metropolitan Music Bureau. In 1948 he was elected president of Columbia Artists Management. He died in Delray Beach, Florida on August 26, 1990.

See also
 Trapp Family

References

New-York Tribune personnel
1893 births
1990 deaths